The 1986 Cork Junior A Hurling Championship was the 89th staging of the Cork Junior A Hurling Championship since its establishment by the Cork County Board. The championship began on 14 September 1986 and ended on 26 October 1986.

On 26 October 1986, Ballymartle won the championship following a 3–08 to 2–04 defeat of Meelin in the final. This was their third championship title overall and their first title since 1958.

References

1986 in hurling
Cork Junior Hurling Championship